Muhammad Khel is a town and union council in Bannu District of Khyber-Pakhtunkhwa. It is located at 32°58'60N 70°31'60E and has an altitude of 369 metres (1213 feet).

It is also the name of a clan of the Orakzai tribe of Pashtuns of Pakistan.

References

Union councils of Bannu District
Populated places in Bannu District